Schistura geisleri is a species of ray-finned fish in the genus Schistura, the most speciose of the genera within the stone loach family, Nemacheilidae. Its known range is in the upper parts of the Chao Praya in Thailand but it has also been reported from the Tapi River in Peninsular Thailand, as it has not been recorded from the darainages between these two systems the taxonomic status of the Tapi population may need to be reassessed. Its habitat is slow flowing streams with depths no greater than 30 cm during the dry season and in shallow riffles with a substrate consisting of pebbles which are up to 5 cm in diameter, with a moderate current and clear water. The specific name honours the German aquarist Rolf Geisler (1925-2012), in thanks for his "valuable help".

References 

G
Fish described in 1990